Morris D. Brown (? - ?) was an American carom billiards champion.

Biography
On March 19, 1914 he defeated the previous champion, Joseph Mayer at the Amateur Billiard Club by 400 to 379. This allowed him to move to the next round of games. He then lost the championship match on March 21, 1914 to Edward W. Gardner in the balkline championship by 400 to 386. On April 9, 1914 he again defeated Joseph Mayer in the Arion Society's Interstate Challenge by 300 to 232.

External links
Morris D. Brown at Flickr Commons
Morris D. Brown diary (1898) at the New-York Historical Society

References

Year of birth missing
Year of death missing
American pool players